Flavin reductase (NADH) (NADH-dependent flavin reductase, flavin:NADH oxidoreductase) is an enzyme with systematic name flavin:NAD+ oxidoreductase. This enzyme catalyses the following chemical reaction

 reduced flavin + NAD+  flavin + NADH + H+

The Escherichia coli enzyme reduces free flavins by NADH.

References

External links 
 

EC 1.5.1